La De los ojos color del tiempo is a 1952 Argentine film starring Mirtha Legrand, Carlos Thompson and Zoe Ducos.

Cast

External links
 

1952 films
1950s Spanish-language films
Argentine black-and-white films
Films directed by Luis César Amadori
Argentine drama films
1952 drama films
1950s Argentine films